Lower Lake Stone Jail, in Lower Lake, California, is a one-room jail claimed to be the smallest jail in the United States, was erected in 1876 of stone locally quarried and reinforced with iron. During the days of the first quicksilver operations of the Sulphur Bank Mine, lasting from 1873 to 1883, rapid town growth and the urgent need for civil order necessitated the building of a jail. Stephen Nicolai, one of the first stonemasons in Lower Lake, built the jail from local materials with the help of Theodore and John Copsey.

The tiny jail is now defunct, and has been designated California Historical Landmark #429.

References

External links
Pictures of Lower Lake Stone Jail

1876 establishments in California
California Historical Landmarks
Buildings and structures in Lake County, California
Defunct prisons in California
Jails in California
Lower Lake, California